Pyroxmangite has the general chemical formula of MnSiO3. It is the high-pressure, low-temperature dimorph of rhodonite.

It was first described in 1913 and named for the mineral group, pyroxenes, and is known as the manganese member. It forms a series with pyroxferroite.

Pyroxmangite occurs in metamorphosed ore deposits rich in manganese. Associated minerals include spessartine, tephroite, alleghanyite, hausmannite, pyrophanite, alabandite, rhodonite and rhodochrosite.

References

Manganese(II) minerals
Pyroxene group
Triclinic minerals
Minerals in space group 2